Margaret Vivienne Calvert  (born 1936) is a British typographer and graphic designer who, with colleague Jock Kinneir, designed many of the road signs used throughout the United Kingdom, Crown Dependencies, and British Overseas Territories, as well as the Transport font used on road signs, the Rail Alphabet font used on the British railway system, and an early version of the signs used in airports. The typeface developed by Kinneir and Calvert was further developed into New Transport and used for the single domain GOV.UK website in the United Kingdom.

Early life and education
Born in South Africa, Calvert moved to England in 1950, where she studied at St Paul's Girls' School and the Chelsea College of Art. Kinneir, her tutor there, asked her to help him design the signs for Gatwick Airport.  They chose the black on yellow scheme for the signs after researching the most effective combination. They also designed luggage labels for P & O Lines in 1957.

Career
In 1957, Kinneir was appointed head of British signs for Britain's roads. He then hired Calvert to redesign the road sign system and she came up with simple, easy-to-understand pictograms, including the signs for 'men at work' (a man digging), 'farm animals' (based on a cow named Patience that lived on a farm near to where she grew up), and 'schoolchildren nearby' (a girl leading a boy by the hand, which she said were actually modelled after herself), using the European protocol of triangular signs for warnings and circles for mandatory restrictions. The Worboys Committee was formed by the British government in July 1963 to review signage on all British roads.

In addition to her road signs, Calvert has designed commercial fonts for Monotype, including the eponymous Calvert font, a slab serif design which she created in 1980. It originated in a 1970s proposal to the French new town of Saint Quentin-en-Yvelines for a new font to provide a visual identity for the town. However, the slab-serif typeface and three-dimensional letter shapes were rejected. The font was later adopted by the Tyne and Wear Metro system as well as north-east England bus and ferry services in the 1980s.

In 2020 a new version of the font used in the UK rail system was introduced, Rail Alphabet 2. It was designed in collaboration with Henrik Kubel.

Calvert taught at the Royal College of Art for almost 40 years and was head of graphics from 1987 to 1991.

Recognition
Calvert was awarded an honorary degree by the University of the Arts London in 2004.

She appeared on the fourteenth season of the famous motoring show,Top Gear on 3 January 2010. James May interviewed her in a 2009 Vauxhall Insignia VXR, talking about the design process of the UK road signs.

She was made a Royal Designer for Industry for Graphic Design in 2011. In 2015, she was presented with the D&AD President's Award.

Calvert was appointed Officer of the Order of the British Empire (OBE) in the 2016 Birthday Honours for services to typography and road safety.

In June 2018 she was awarded an Honorary Fellowship by Arts University Bournemouth alongside dancer Darcey Bussell, costume designer Jenny Beavan OBE and director and screenwriter Edgar Wright.

A retrospective exhibition of her work, Margaret Calvert: Woman at Work, was held from 21 October 2020 till 10 January 2021 at the Design Museum in London.

Gallery of work

References

Citations

Sources

Further reading

External links
 Keep it Simple: interview by Francesco Padovani
 The Brits Who Designed the Modern World Artsnight - Series 4: 7, BBC Two

1936 births
Living people
British designers
British graphic designers
British typographers and type designers
History of transport in the Isle of Man
History of transport in the United Kingdom
Officers of the Order of the British Empire
People educated at St Paul's Girls' School
South African emigrants to the United Kingdom